The 2005 Division I Men's NCAA Division I men's soccer tournament was a tournament of 48 teams from NCAA Division I who played for the NCAA Championship in soccer. The College Cup for the final four teams was held at SAS Soccer Park in Cary, North Carolina. All the other games were played at the home field of the higher-seeded team. The final was held on December 11, 2005, with Maryland defeating New Mexico, 1–0, for the title.

Regional 1

Regional 2

Regional 3

Regional 4

College Cup – SAS Soccer Park, Cary, North Carolina

See also
NCAA Men's Soccer Championship

References

NCAA Division I Mens Soccer
NCAA Division I Men's Soccer Tournament seasons
NCAA Division I men's soccer tournament
NCAA Division I men's soccer tournament